Johan Verweij is a former football (soccer) player who represented New Zealand at international level.

Playing career
Verweij made his full All Whites debut in a 1–0 win over Australia on 13 June 1979 and ended his international playing career with five A-international caps and one goal to his credit, his final cap a substitute appearance in a 2–0 win over Ghana on 7 June 1983.

Verweij played youth football in his father's country, the Netherlands in the mid 1970s and won the Dutch Youth Cup with Feyenoord.
Verweij won the New Zealand national football competition three times and the national cup competition, the Chatham Cup. twice with Christchurch United.

References 

Living people
New Zealand association footballers
New Zealand international footballers
New Zealand people of Dutch descent
1955 births
Association football midfielders